The fourteenth season of The Bachelorette premiered on May 28, 2018. This season features Becca Kufrin, a 28-year-old publicist from Prior Lake, Minnesota.

Kufrin was the winner of season 22 of The Bachelor featuring Arie Luyendyk Jr.; however, Luyendyk broke off his engagement with Kufrin to resume a relationship with runner-up Lauren Burnham, to whom he is now married. The season concluded on August 6, 2018, with Kufrin accepting a proposal from 29-year-old medical sales representative Garrett Yrigoyen. They announced their engagement had ended on September 1, 2020.

Production

Casting and contestants
Casting began during season thirteen of The Bachelorette. Kufrin was named as the bachelorette during the "After the Final Rose" special of season 22 of The Bachelor on March 6, 2018. During the live finale of the latter season, Kufrin met the first five contestants: Lincoln, Blake, Ryan, Chase and Darius.

Notable contestants included Philadelphia Eagles tight end Clay Harbor and undrafted free agent Colton Underwood.

Filming and development
Filming began on March 15, 2018 at The Bachelor Mansion, it was reported in Richmond, Virginia during April 6 – 9 at Lombardy Street, Virginia State Capitol, Edgar Allan Poe Museum, Veil Brewing Company, and Carpenter Theatre. Besides Virginia, this season also included visits to Utah, Nevada, The Bahamas, Thailand, and Maldives. Appearances on this season are musicians Lil Jon, Richard Marx, Granger Smith, Wayne Newton, Morgan Evans, Baha Men and Betty Who and sports personalities Keyshawn Johnson, Valerie Fleming and Shauna Rohbock.

Virginia governor Ralph Northam also made his appearance as the audience member in the group date held in Richmond, Virginia.

Contestants

The first 5 contestants were revealed in The Bachelor season 22 finale on March 6, 2018. The full cast of 28 contestants was later revealed on May 18.

Future appearances

The Bachelor

Colton Underwood was chosen as the lead for season 23 of The Bachelor.

Bachelor in Paradise
Season 5

David Ravitz, Kamil Nicalek, Joe Amabile, John Graham, Jordan Kimball, Nick Spetsas, Chris Randone, Colton Underwood, Connor Obrochta, Wills Reid, and Leo Dottavio returned for season 5 of Bachelor in Paradise. Reid and Spetsas were eliminated in week one. Dottavio was removed in week three. Obrochta and Ravitz were eliminated in week three. Underwood quit in week four. Amabile quit in week five. Graham split from Olivia Goethals in week six. Nicalek left in a relationship with Annaliese Puccini. Kimball left engaged to Jenna Cooper, and Randone left engaged to Krystal Nielson.

Season 6

Kimball and Reid along with Blake Horstmann, Christian Estrada, and Clay Harbor returned for season 6 of Bachelor in Paradise. Estrada and Kimball were removed by production in week 2 due to their aggressive behavior towards one another. Reid was eliminated in week 2. Horstmann quit during week 5. Harbor split from Nicole Lopez-Alvar in week 6.

Season 7

Amabile returned for season 7 of Bachelor in Paradise alongside Becca Kufrin herself. Kufrin split from Thomas Jacobs in week 6, although they've since gotten back together. Amabile got engaged to Serena Pitt in week 6.

Australia Season 2

Obrochta later appeared on the second season in the Australian version of Bachelor in Paradise. He left in episode 11.

Bachelor in Paradise Canada

Nicalek returned for the inaugural season of Bachelor in Paradise Canada. He split from his partner Caitlin Clemmens during week 5.

Dancing with the Stars

Outside of the Bachelor Nation franchise, Amabile competed in season 27 of Dancing With the Stars and was partnered with Jenna Johnson. He made it to the semi-finals before being eliminated.  Kimball joined Amabile and Johnson during week 4's Trio Night.

All Star Shore

Blake Horstmann later competed on All Star Shore, a reality TV series on Paramount+.

Call-out order

 The contestant received the first impression rose
 The contestant received a rose during a date
 The contestant received a rose during the cocktail party
 The contestant was eliminated
 The contestant was eliminated during a date
 The contestant was eliminated outside the rose ceremony
 The contestant received a rose during the date but quit the competition
 The contestant won the competition

Episodes

Controversies

Garrett Yrigoyen Instagram likes
The show came under fire when it was revealed that Garrett Yrigoyen, who was the recipient of the "First Impression" rose and the eventual winner, had liked offensive posts on Instagram that mocked the transgender community, immigrants, and politically liberal women, along with one post that referred to David Hogg, a survivor of the Stoneman Douglas High School shooting, as a crisis actor. Yrigoyen later apologized on Instagram for the hurt and offense that liking the posts may have caused and stated that he will be more mindful of what he likes in the future as those likes "were not a true reflection of [him] or [his morals]".

Lincoln Adim sexual misconduct charges
On June 13, 2018, the show came under more fire for allowing contestant Lincoln Adim to participate in the show after he had been charged with groping and assaulting a woman on a harbor cruise ship on May 30, 2016. Adim was convicted of this crime after he finished filming and one week before the season premiered. Adim will be registered as a sex-offender. Warner Bros., who produces the show, claim that Adim lied about facing sexual misconduct charges and that they use a third-party company to conduct background checks, claiming:

Colton Underwood drama
In January 2018, before being cast for The Bachelorette, Underwood had a brief relationship with The Bachelor season 22 contestant, Tia Booth. Kufrin was made aware of the relationship early in the season, but after Underwood received a hometown date, Booth came back and told Kufrin that she still had feelings for him. Underwood was then eliminated.

During Underwood's hometown date, he revealed to Kufrin that she was the first girl he has brought home to meet his family. This was later proven to be untrue as fans of the show found old pictures of Underwood's ex-girlfriend, Aly Raisman, at his home with his family.

After Underwood disclosed to Kufrin that he was a virgin, Wendy Williams commented on her show that she "[doesn't] trust people that have never had a drink, a smoke, and [she doesn't] trust people that have never had sex".  Williams received criticism from some fans, saying she humiliated Underwood and that virgin-shaming was not okay. Underwood responded to Williams on Twitter by stating "Don’t trust a virgin, but you’ll trust your 3 baby daddies who cheat on you every weekend. Okay". The tweet was ill-received by some fans of The Bachelorette, believing it had racist and slut-shaming undertones.

References

External links

2018 American television seasons
The Bachelorette (American TV series) seasons
Television shows filmed in California
Television shows filmed in Utah
Television shows shot in the Las Vegas Valley
Television shows filmed in Virginia
Television shows filmed in the Bahamas
Television shows filmed in New York (state)
Television shows filmed in Colorado
Television shows filmed in Thailand
Television shows filmed in the Maldives